This is a list of notable missionaries from Slovenia:

B 
 Frederic Baraga (1797–1868; United States)

H 
 Ferdinand Augustin Hallerstein (1703–1774; China)

K 
 Jožef Kerec (1892–1974; Malaysia, Makao, Hongkong, China)
 Ignatius Knoblecher (1819–1858; Egypt, Sudan)

M 
 Ignatius Mrak (1818–1901; U.S.)

O 
 Pedro Opeka (born 1948)

P 
 Francis Xavier Pierz (1785–1880; U.S.)

 
Mission
Slovenian